Presidential elections were held in Burkina Faso on 1 December 1991. They were the first elections in the country since 1978, but were boycotted by the opposition parties. The result was a victory for the only candidate, incumbent President Blaise Compaoré, although voter turnout was just 27.3%.

Results

References

Presidential elections in Burkina Faso
Burkina Faso
1991 in Burkina Faso
Single-candidate elections